The common shelduck (Tadorna tadorna) is a waterfowl species of the shelduck genus, Tadorna. It is widespread and common in the Euro-Siberian region of the Palearctic, mainly breeding in temperate and wintering in subtropical regions; in winter, it can also be found in the Maghreb.

Fossil bones from Dorkovo (Bulgaria) described as Balcanas pliocaenica may actually belong to this species. More likely, they are an extinct species of Tadorna (if not a distinct genus) due to their Early Pliocene age; the present species is not unequivocally attested from the fossil record until some 2–3 million years later (Late Pliocene/Early Pleistocene).

Taxonomy
The common shelduck was formally named by the Swedish naturalist Carl Linnaeus in 1758 in the tenth edition of his Systema Naturae under the binomial name Anas tadorna. Linnaeus largely based his description on "The Sheldrake or Burrough-Duck" that had been described and illustrated in 1731 by the English naturalist Eleazar Albin. The specific epithet comes from the French word Tadorne for this species, a name that was used by the French naturalist Pierre Belon in 1555. It may originally derive from Celtic roots meaning "pied waterfowl", essentially the same as the English "shelduck". Linnaeus specified the locality as Europe but restricted this to Sweden in 1761. The common shelduck is now placed in the genus Tadorna that was introduced in 1822 by the German zoologist Friedrich Boie. The species is monotypic: no subspecies are recognised.

Description
The common shelduck resembles a small short-necked goose in size and shape. It is a striking bird, with a reddish-pink bill, pink feet, a white body with chestnut patches and a black belly, and a dark green head and neck. The wing coverts are white, the primary remiges black, and the secondaries green (only showing in flight) and chestnut. The underwings are almost entirely white. Sexes are similar, but the female is smaller, with some white facial markings, while the male is particularly crisply coloured in the breeding season, his bill bright red and bearing a prominent knob at the forehead.

Ducklings are white, with black cap, hindneck and wing and back patches. Juveniles are similarly coloured, greyish above and mostly white below, but already have the adult's wing pattern.

The call is a loud honk.

Distribution and habitat
This is a bird which breeds in temperate Eurosiberia. Most populations migrate to subtropical areas in winter, but this species is largely resident in westernmost Europe, apart from movements to favoured moulting grounds, such as the Wadden Sea on the north German coast.

The common shelduck is common around the coastline of Great Britain and Ireland (where it is known simply as the shelduck), where it frequents salt marshes and estuaries. It frequently nests in rabbit burrows. Sightings of this bird are rare in North America and are reported as infrequent visitors to the U.S. and Canada.

Behaviour
Moulting flocks can be very large (100,000 on the Wadden Sea), since most pairs leave their partially grown young in a crèche with just one or two adults.

This species is mainly associated with lakes and rivers in open country, breeding in rabbit burrows, tree holes, haystacks or similar. In winter it is common on suitable estuaries and tidal mudflats as well.

This bird is one of the species to which the Agreement on the Conservation of African-Eurasian Migratory Waterbirds (AEWA) applies.

The young will dive under water to avoid predators and the adults will fly away from them to act as a decoy.

References

External links

RSPB Birds by Name
Ageing and sexing (PDF; 1.2 MB) by Javier Blasco-Zumeta & Gerd-Michael Heinze
Range map in Iran

Tadorna
Birds of Asia
Birds of Europe
Common shelduck
Common shelduck